Just A Geek is a book of memoirs written by actor and author Wil Wheaton.  It was published in 2004.

In the book, he talks about life before and after Star Trek: The Next Generation.  Many parts of the book are derived from posts to his blog.

External links
Wil Wheaton's blog

2004 non-fiction books
Show business memoirs